The 1915–16 Swiss National Ice Hockey Championship was the sixth edition of the national ice hockey championship in Switzerland. HC Bern won the championship by defeating Club des Patineurs Lausanne in the final.

First round

Eastern Series 
 Akademischer EHC Zürich - HC Bern 2:5

HC Bern qualified for the final.

Western Series

Final 
 HC Bern - Club des Patineurs Lausanne 7:1

External links 
Swiss Ice Hockey Federation – All-time results

National
Swiss National Ice Hockey Championship seasons